Swyre Head, Lulworth is a hill and sea cliff which lies on the Jurassic Coast between Bat's Head to the west and Durdle Door to the east, close to Lulworth (further to the east) in Dorset, England.

The cliffs of Swyre Head, Lulworth, are of chalk and are steep, with grassland and a footpath above. The footpath runs close to the cliff edge and is steeply undulating. Despite the steepness, it is popular for walks and the scenery is spectacular.

Between Swyre Head and the natural rock arch of Durdle Door is a small dry valley known as Scratchy Bottom.

References 

Cliffs of England
Headlands of Dorset
Jurassic Coast